Maximilian Maria Kolbe  (born Raymund Kolbe; ; 1894–1941) was a Polish Catholic priest and Conventual Franciscan friar who volunteered to die in place of a man named Franciszek Gajowniczek in the German death camp of Auschwitz, located in German-occupied Poland during World War II. He had been active in promoting the veneration of the Immaculate Virgin Mary, founding and supervising the monastery of Niepokalanów near Warsaw, operating an amateur-radio station (SP3RN), and founding or running several other organizations and publications.
 
On 10 October 1982, Pope John Paul II canonized Kolbe and declared him a martyr of charity. The Catholic Church venerates him as the patron saint of amateur radio operators, drug addicts, political prisoners, families, journalists, and prisoners. John Paul II declared him "the patron of our difficult century". His feast day is 14 August, the day of his death.

Due to Kolbe's efforts to promote consecration and entrustment to Mary, he is known as the Apostle of Consecration to Mary.

Early life
Raymund Kolbe was born on 8 January 1894 in Zduńska Wola, in the Kingdom of Poland, which was then part of the Russian Empire. He was the second son of weaver Julius Kolbe and midwife Maria Dąbrowska. His father was an ethnic German, and his mother was Polish. He had four brothers. Shortly after his birth, his family moved to Pabianice.

Kolbe's life was strongly influenced in 1906, when he was 12, by a vision of the Virgin Mary. He later described this incident:

That night I asked the Mother of God what was to become of me. Then she came to me holding two crowns, one white, the other red. She asked me if I was willing to accept either of these crowns. The white one meant that I should persevere in purity and the red that I should become a martyr. I said that I would accept them both.

Franciscan friar
In 1907 Kolbe and his elder brother Francis joined the Conventual Franciscans. They enrolled at the Conventual Franciscan minor seminary in Lwow later that year. In 1910, Kolbe was allowed to enter the novitiate, where he chose a religious name Maximilian. He professed his first vows in 1911, and final vows in 1914, adopting the additional name of Maria (Mary).

World War I
Kolbe was sent to Rome in 1912, where he attended the Pontifical Gregorian University. He earned a doctorate in philosophy in 1915 there. From 1915 he continued his studies at the Pontifical University of St. Bonaventure, where he earned a doctorate in theology in 1919 or 1922 (sources vary). He was active in the consecration and entrustment to Mary.

In the midst of these studies, World War I broke out. Maximilian's father, Julius Kolbe, joined Jozef Piłsudski's Polish Legions fighting against the Russians for an independent Poland, still subjugated and still divided among Prussia, Russia, and Austria. Julius Kolbe was caught and hanged as a traitor by the Russians at the relatively young age of 43, a traumatic event for young Maximilian.

During his time as a student, he witnessed vehement demonstrations against Popes Pius X and Benedict XV in Rome during an anniversary celebration by the Freemasons. According to Kolbe:

They placed the black standard of the "Giordano Brunisti" under the windows of the Vatican. On this standard the archangel, Michael, was depicted lying under the feet of the triumphant Lucifer. At the same time, countless pamphlets were distributed to the people in which the Holy Father (i.e., the Pope) was attacked shamefully.

Soon afterward, on 16 October 1917, Kolbe organized the Militia Immaculatae (Army of the Immaculate One), to work for conversion of sinners and enemies of the Catholic Church, specifically the Freemasons, through the intercession of the Virgin Mary. So serious was Kolbe about this goal that he added to the Miraculous Medal prayer:

O Mary, conceived without sin, pray for us who have recourse to thee. And for all those who do not have recourse to thee; especially the Freemasons and all those recommended to thee.

Kolbe wanted the entire Franciscan Order consecrated to the Immaculate by an additional vow. The idea was well received, but faced the hurdles of approval by the hierarchy of the order and the lawyers, so it was never formally adopted during his life and was no longer pursued after his death.

Ordination
In 1918, Kolbe was ordained a priest. In July 1919, he returned to Poland, which was newly independent. He was active in promoting the veneration of the Immaculate Virgin Mary. He was strongly opposed to leftist – in particular, communist – movements.

From 1919 to 1922, he taught at the Kraków Seminary. Around that time, as well as earlier in Rome, he suffered from tuberculosis, which forced him to take a lengthy leave of absence from his teaching duties. In those pre-antibiotic times, tuberculosis was generally considered fatal, with rest and good nutrition the best treatment.

In January 1922, Kolbe founded the monthly periodical Rycerz Niepokalanej (Knight of the Immaculata), a devotional publication based on French Le Messager du Coeur de Jesus (Messenger of the Heart of Jesus). From 1922 to 1926, he operated a religious publishing press in Grodno. As his activities grew in scope, in 1927 he founded a new Conventual Franciscan monastery at Niepokalanów near Warsaw. It became a major religious publishing centre. A junior seminary was opened there two years later.

Missionary work in Asia
Between 1930 and 1936, Kolbe undertook a series of missions to East Asia. He arrived first in Shanghai, China, but failed to gather a following there. Next he moved to Japan, where by 1931 he had founded a Franciscan monastery, Mugenzai no Sono, on the outskirts of Nagasaki.

Kolbe had started publishing a Japanese edition of the Knight of the Immaculata. The monastery he founded remains prominent in the Roman Catholic Church in Japan. Kolbe had the monastery built on a mountainside. According to Shinto beliefs, this was not the side best suited to be in harmony with nature. However, when the United States dropped the atomic bomb on Nagasaki, the Franciscan monastery survived, unlike the Immaculate Conception Cathedral, the latter having been on the side of the mountain that took the main force of the blast.

In mid-1932, Kolbe left Japan for Malabar, India, where he founded another monastery, which has since closed.

Return to Poland
Meanwhile, in his absence the monastery at Niepokalanów began to publish a daily newspaper Mały Dziennik (the Small Diary), in alliance with the political group National Radical Camp (Obóz Narodowo Radykalny). This publication reached a circulation of 137,000, and nearly double that, 225,000, on weekends. Kolbe returned to Poland in 1933 for a general chapter of the order in Kraków. Kolbe returned to Japan and remained there until called back to attend the Provincial Chapter in Poland in 1936. There he was appointed guardian of Niepokalanów, thus precluding his return to Japan. Two years later, in 1938, he started a radio station at Niepokalanów, Radio Niepokalanów. He held an amateur radio licence, with the call sign SP3RN.

World War II
After the outbreak of World War II, Kolbe was one of the few friars who remained in the monastery, where he organized a temporary hospital. After the town was captured by the Germans, they arrested him on 19 September 1939; he was later released on 8 December. He refused to sign the Deutsche Volksliste, which would have given him rights similar to those of German citizens in exchange for recognizing his ethnic German ancestry. Upon his release he continued work at his friary where he and other friars provided shelter to refugees from Greater Poland including 2,000 Jews whom he hid from German persecution in the Niepokalanów friary. Kolbe received permission to continue publishing religious works, though significantly reduced in scope. The monastery continued to act as a publishing house, issuing a number of anti-Nazi German publications.

Auschwitz

On 17 February 1941, the monastery was shut down by the German authorities. That day Kolbe and four others were arrested by the Gestapo and imprisoned in the Pawiak prison. On 28 May, he was transferred to Auschwitz as prisoner 16670.

Continuing to act as a priest, Kolbe was subjected to violent harassment, including beatings and lashings. Once he was smuggled to a prison hospital by friendly inmates.

Martyrdom 
At the end of July 1941, a prisoner escaped from the camp, prompting the deputy camp commander, SS-Hauptsturmführer Karl Fritzsch, to pick ten men to be starved to death in an underground bunker to deter further escape attempts. When one of the selected men, Franciszek Gajowniczek, cried out, "My wife! My children!" Kolbe volunteered to take his place.

According to an eyewitness, who was an assistant janitor at that time, in his prison cell Kolbe led the prisoners in prayer. Each time the guards checked on him, he was standing or kneeling in the middle of the cell and looking calmly at those who entered. After they had been starved and deprived of water for two weeks, only Kolbe and three others remained alive.

The guards wanted the bunker emptied, so they gave the four remaining prisoners lethal injections of carbolic acid. Kolbe is said to have raised his left arm and calmly waited for the deadly injection. He died on 14 August 1941. His remains were cremated on 15 August, the feast day of the Assumption of Mary.

Canonization
On May 12, 1955, Kolbe was recognized by the Holy See as a Servant of God. Kolbe was declared venerable by Pope Paul VI on January 30, 1969, beatified as a Confessor of the Faith by the same Pope in 1971, and canonized as a saint by Pope John Paul II on October 10, 1982. Upon canonization, the Pope declared Maximilian Kolbe as a confessor and a martyr of charity. The miracles that were used to confirm his beatification were the July 1948 cure of intestinal tuberculosis in Angela Testoni and in August 1950, the cure of calcification of the arteries/sclerosis of Francis Ranier; both attributed to Kolbe's intercession by their prayers to him.

Franciszek Gajowniczek, the man Kolbe saved at Auschwitz, survived the Holocaust and was present as a guest at both the beatification and the canonization ceremonies.

After his canonisation, a feast day for Maximilian Kolbe was added to the General Roman Calendar. He is one of ten 20th-century martyrs who are depicted in statues above the Great West Door of Anglican Westminster Abbey, London.

Maximilian Kolbe is remembered in the Church of England with a commemoration on 14 August.

Controversies
Kolbe's recognition as a Christian martyr generated some controversy within the Catholic Church. While his self-sacrifice at Auschwitz was considered saintly and heroic, he was not killed out of odium fidei (hatred of the faith), but as the result of his act of Christian charity toward another man. Pope Paul VI recognized this distinction at Kolbe's beatification, naming him a Confessor and giving him the unofficial title "martyr of charity." Pope John Paul II, however, overruled the commission he had established (which agreed with the earlier assessment of heroic charity). John Paul II wanted to make the point that the Nazis' systematic hatred of whole categories of humanity was inherently also a hatred of religious (Christian) faith; he said that Kolbe's death equated to earlier examples of religious martyrdom.

Accusations of antisemitism
Kolbe has been accused of antisemitism. In 1926, in the first issue of the monthly Knight of the Immaculate, Kolbe said he considered Freemasons "as an organized clique of fanatical Jews, who want to destroy the church." In a 1924 column, he cited the Protocols of the Elders of Zion as an "important proof" that "the founders of Zionism intended, in fact, the subjugation of the entire world", but that "not even all Jews know this". In a calendar that the publishing house of his organization, the Militia of the Immaculate, published in an edition of a million in 1939, Kolbe wrote, "Atheistic Communism seems to rage ever more wildly. Its origin can easily be located in that criminal mafia that calls itself Freemasonry, and the hand that is guiding all that toward a clear goal is international Zionism. Which should not be taken to mean that even among Jews one cannot find good people." Newspapers he published printed articles about topics such as a Zionist plot for world domination. Slovenian philosopher Slavoj Žižek criticized Kolbe's activities as "writing and organizing mass propaganda for the Catholic Church, with a clear anti-Semitic and anti-Masonic edge." However, a number of writers pointed out that the "Jewish question played a very minor role in Kolbe's thought and work." On those grounds allegations of Kolbe's antisemitism have been denounced by Holocaust scholars Daniel L. Schlafly Jr. and Warren Green among others. Kolbe's alleged antisemitism was a source of controversy in the 1980s in the aftermath of his canonization.

During World War II, Kolbe's monastery at Niepokalanów sheltered Jewish refugees. According to the testimony of a local, "When Jews came to me asking for a piece of bread, I asked Father Maximilian if I could give it to them in good conscience, and he answered me, 'Yes, it is necessary to do this because all men are our brothers.'"

Relics
First-class relics of Kolbe exist, in the form of hairs from his head and beard, preserved without his knowledge by two friars at Niepokalanów who served as barbers in his friary between 1930 and 1941. Since his beatification in 1971, more than 1,000 such relics have been distributed around the world for public veneration. Second-class relics, such as his personal effects, clothing and liturgical vestments, are preserved in his monastery cell and in a chapel at Niepokalanów, where they may be venerated by visitors.

Influence

Kolbe influenced his own Order of Conventual Franciscan friars, as the Militia Immaculatae movement had continued. In recent years new religious and secular institutes have been founded, inspired from this spiritual way. Among these are the Missionaries of the Immaculate Mary – Fr. Kolbe, the Franciscan Friars of Mary Immaculate, and a parallel congregation of religious sisters and others. The Franciscan Friars of Mary Immaculate are taught basic Polish so they can sing the traditional hymns sung by Kolbe, in his native tongue.

According to the friars:
Our patron, St. Maximilian Kolbe, inspires us with his unique Mariology and apostolic mission, which is to bring all souls to the Sacred Heart of Christ through the Immaculate Heart of Mary, Christ's most pure, efficient, and holy instrument of evangelization – especially those most estranged from the Church.

Kolbe's views into Marian theology echo today through their influence on Vatican II. His image may be found in churches across Europe and throughout the world. Several churches in Poland are under his patronage, such as the Sanctuary of Saint Maxymilian in Zduńska Wola or the Church of Saint Maxymilian Kolbe in Szczecin. A museum, Museum of St. Maximilian Kolbe "There was a Man", was opened in Niepokalanów in 1998.

In 1963, Rolf Hochhuth published The Deputy, a play significantly influenced by Kolbe's life and dedicated to him. In 2000, the National Conference of Catholic Bishops (US) designated Marytown, home to a community of Conventual Franciscan friars, as the National Shrine of St. Maximilian Kolbe. Marytown is located in Libertyville, Illinois. It features the Kolbe Holocaust Exhibit. In 1991, Krzysztof Zanussi released a Polish film about the life of Kolbe, in which Edward Żentara played Kobe's role. The Polish Senate declared the year 2011 to be the year of Maximilian Kolbe.

There are examples of Catholic institutions around the world adopting Kolbe as their patron saint. An example of this is Kolbe Catholic College in Rockingham, Western Australia. Founded in 1989, the college is a secondary education institution that uses the motto of "courage, faith and excellence" to connect with Kolbe's charism. In 2014, to commemorate the 25th anniversary of the College, staff and students went on pilgrimage to Poland and Italy to retrace the life of Kolbe. The pilgrimage includes Auschwitz to connect with "courage", Niepokalanow to connect with "faith", and Rome to connect with "excellence". The college has returned to Europe with around 16 students and 2 or 3 faculty members again in 2016, to coincide with World Youth Day celebrations in Krakow, and then again in 2018.

Immaculata prayer
Kolbe composed the Immaculata prayer as a prayer of consecration to the Immaculata, i.e. the immaculately conceived.

See also
 Holocaust theology
 Maximilian of Tebessa
 Peter Fehlner
 Sisters Minor of Mary Immaculate

Notes

References

Further reading

External links

 Patron Saints Index: Saint Maximilian Kolbe
 Kolbe's Gift, a play by David Gooderson about Kolbe and his self-sacrifice in Auschwitz based on factual evidence and conversations with the late Józef Garliński
 A Man Feared by the 21st Century: Saint Maximilian Kolbe from the Starvation Bunker in Auschwitz – a drama by Kazimierz Braun
 Saint Maximilian Kolbe, a popular biography at Catholicism.org
 Niepokalanów in English
 Catholic Online, St. Maximilian Kolbe, Catholic Online.Inform-Inspire-Ignite.
 St. Maximilian Kolbe Website
 An "Insight" episode which mentions Maximilian Kolbe, who was portrayed by Werner Klemperer
 Radio Kolbe, International Radio Group OM / SWL / CB / PMR446 (Based in Italy)

1894 births
1941 deaths
People from Zduńska Wola
People from Kalisz Governorate
20th-century Polish Roman Catholic priests
20th-century Christian saints
Anglican saints
Anti-Masonry
Canonizations by Pope John Paul II
Catholic saints and blesseds of the Nazi era
Conventual Friars Minor
Polish Franciscans
Executed German Resistance members
Martyred Roman Catholic priests
People celebrated in the Lutheran liturgical calendar
Polish anti-communists
Polish civilians killed in World War II
Polish people of German descent
Polish people who died in Auschwitz concentration camp
Polish Roman Catholic saints
Pontifical Gregorian University alumni
Pontifical University of St. Bonaventure alumni
Roman Catholic activists
Amateur radio people
People executed by Nazi Germany by lethal injection
Franciscan saints